Andrew Wilson Baird  (26 April 1842 – 2 April 1908) was a Scottish colonel of the Royal Engineers. He is best remembered for his work in tidal studies of the coast of India.

Life
Born and baptised 26 April 1842 in Aberdeen, he was the son of Thomas Baird and Catherine Imray. He was educated at Marischal College, Aberdeen, before entering the Military College of the East India Company at Addiscombe in June 1860. Joining the Royal Military Academy at Woolwich in January 1861, he was made a lieutenant in the Royal Engineers the following year, and sailed for India on 1 March 1864. In India he was appointed special assistant engineer of the Bombay harbour defence works, and was responsible for ordering the buildings of the batteries at Oyster Rock and Middle Ground. After serving as assistant field engineer in the Abyssinian expedition of 1868 under Sir Robert Napier, in December 1869 Baird was assistant superintendent of the trigonometrical survey of India, and conducted extensive tidal observations at the Gulf of Cutch. He briefly returned to England in 1870, after being affected by the heat, but returned and continued his work in tidal observations. He was promoted to captain on 4 April 1874 and a major on 18 December 1881.

Between July 1885 and August 1889, he headed the mints at Calcutta and Bombay, until he was appointed the permanent mint master at Calcutta on 12 August. He was appointed a colonel on 9 April 1896, and retired from the mint the following year, making his home at Palmers Cross, near Elgin, Moray.

In 1885, he was elected a Fellow of the Royal Society. and appointed CSI in the 1897 Diamond Jubilee Honours.

He was the father of Gen. Sir Douglas Baird.

He died on 2nd April 1908 and was buried on the eastern side of Highgate Cemetery. His grave (no.37143) has no headstone or marker.

References

External links

1842 births
1908 deaths
Burials at Highgate Cemetery
People from Aberdeen
Alumni of the University of Aberdeen
Companions of the Order of the Star of India
Royal Engineers officers
Fellows of the Royal Society